Agyra is a genus of moths of the family Noctuidae.

Species
Agyra conspersa (Walker, 1862)
Agyra merchandi Guenee, 1852

References
Natural History Museum Lepidoptera genus database

Catocalinae
Noctuoidea genera